Abdolabad (also Romanized as ‘Abdolābād; also known as ‘Abdollāhābād and ‘Abdulābād) is a village in Shirin Su Rural District, Shirin Su District, Kabudarahang County, Hamadan Province, Iran. At the 2006 census, its population was 435, in 87 families.

References 

Populated places in Kabudarahang County